Karol d'Abancourt de Franqueville may refer to:

 Karol d'Abancourt de Franqueville (soldier) (1811–1849), Polish soldier who fought against the Austrians
 Karol d'Abancourt de Franqueville (lawyer) (1851–1913), Polish politician, social activist, and lawyer